Dmitry Viktorovich Guberniev (born October 6, 1974, Drezna, Moscow Oblast, Russian SFSR, USSR) is a Russian TV presenter, sports commentator of TV channel Match TV. Previously, he was the editor in chief of the Joint Directorate of sports channels VGTRK (2013-2015).

Awards
 TEFI Award winner in 2007 and 2015.
 Journalist of the Year 2012; version Biathlon-Award.

Personal life
He was married to the former track and field champion Olga Bogoslovskaya. He has a son, Mikhail, born in 2002.

Guberniev has gotten himself into trouble a number of times for outbursts on live broadcasts, most notably in 2017 when calling French biathlete Martin Fourcade a pig, for which he later apologised. In 2020, he lashed out at tennis commentator Ekaterina Bychkova, calling her "a stupid, vile creature".

On 18 March 2022, Guberniev, together with Maria Sittel, was the host of the Moscow rally in support of the Russian invasion of Ukraine.

References

External links

 Dmitry Guberniev. Instagram

1974 births
Living people
Russian television presenters
Russian male voice actors
Sports commentators
Russian sports journalists
Russian State University of Physical Education, Sport, Youth and Tourism, Department of Chess alumni
Sanctioned due to Russo-Ukrainian War